Mevidalen (developmental code name LY-3154207) is a dopaminergic drug which is under development for the treatment of Lewy body disease, including those with Parkinson's disease. It acts as a selective positive allosteric modulator (PAM) of the dopamine D1 receptor. The drug is orally active and crosses the blood–brain barrier. It is a tetrahydroisoquinoline and is a close analogue of DETQ, another D1 receptor PAM. Mevidalen has been found to have wakefulness-promoting effects in sleep-deprived humans. Side effects of mevidalen have been reported to include increased heart rate and blood pressure, insomnia, dizziness, nausea, vomiting, anxiety, nervousness, fatigue, headaches, palpitations, and contact dermatitis, as well as falls in those with dementia. As of March 2022, mevidalen is in phase 2 clinical trials for the treatment of Lewy body disease. Besides for movement disorders and dementia, D1 receptor PAMs like mevidalen might have value in the treatment of certain neuropsychiatric disorders, such as depression, excessive somnolence, and attention deficit hyperactivity disorder.

References

External links
 Mevidalen - AdisInsight

Tertiary alcohols
Chloroarenes
D1-receptor agonists
Experimental drugs
Ketones
Tetrahydroisoquinolines
Amides
Alcohols